Ahmad Sahroni (born 8 August 1977) is an Indonesian politician from Nasdem Party who is a member of the People's Representative Council.

Personal life
Ahmad Sahroni was born in Tanjung Priok, North Jakarta on 8 August 1977. His father was a nasi padang seller in the Port of Tanjung Priok.

After working for some time, he continued higher education, studying at an economic institute in Bekasi.
He is married to Feby Belinda and the couple has two children. He also became the president of the Ferrari Owners' Club Indonesia. Recently featured in CNBC article on benefits of flying private citing safety as a key factor.

Career
After graduating from high school, Sahroni worked various jobs, including being a driver for a fuel company, working on a cruise ship, and as a waiter. Eventually, he became a company director for the fuel company, and later founded his own company.

He published his autobiography in 2013.

Politics

Sahroni participated in the 2014 Indonesian legislative election, running from Jakarta's 3rd electoral district (North Jakarta, West Jakarta and Thousand Islands Regency). He won 60,683 votes and placed fourth in the district, winning a seat. He became a member of the body's third commission. He endorsed the enforcement of stricter punishment for drug dealers and kingpins.

He was reelected to the legislature following the 2019 legislative election.

References

1977 births
Living people
Politicians from Jakarta
Nasdem Party politicians
Members of the People's Representative Council, 2014
Members of the People's Representative Council, 2019